Shanlin District is a suburban district of Kaohsiung in southern Taiwan. Hakka is one of the major population centers in this area.

History
After the handover of Taiwan from Japan to the Republic of China in 1945, Shanlin was organized as a rural township of Kaohsiung County. On 25 December 2010, Kaohsiung County was merged with Kaohsiung City and Shanlin was upgraded to a district of the city.

In August 2019, some residents living in high-risk areas of Shanlin District were evacuated from their homes after heavy rain and flash flooding.

Quick facts 
Area: 104.0036 km2.
Population: 11,078 people (January 2023)
Divisions: 7 urban villages 142 Neighborhoods
Postal Code: 846
Households: 4,804

Administrative divisions
The district is divided into Shanlin, Muzi, Jilai, Xinzhuang, Shangping, Yuemei, Yuemei and Da-ai/Da'ai Village.

Education

High school 
 Kaohsiung Municipal Shanlin National High School

Primary Schools 
 Shanlin National Primary School
 Yuemeimin Primary School 
 Xinzhuang National Primary School
 Shangping National Primary School
 Chilai National Elementary School
 Kaohsiung City Bananhua Tribe Elementary School in Da'ai Village

Tourist attractions
 Baishueicyuan Waterfall
 Gourd Sculpture Museum
 Shanlin Confucius Temple（新庒孔聖廟）
 Yuemei Leshan Temple (月眉樂善堂)
 Yuemei Bridge

Transportation
A shuttle taxi system named  Happy Taxi  was introduced to both Yuemei Villages of the district on 27 May 2019, the first public transport in the district.

Notable natives
 Lin Yu-fang, member of Legislative Yuan (2008-2016)

See also
 Kaohsiung

References

External links

 

Districts of Kaohsiung